The 2002 Big 12 Men's Basketball tournament took place in Kansas City, Missouri at Kemper Arena. Oklahoma defeated Kansas 64–55 to win their second Big 12 tournament championship.

Seeding
The Tournament consisted of a 12 team single-elimination tournament with the top 4 seeds receiving a bye.

Schedule

Bracket

* Indicates overtime game

All-Tournament Team
Most Outstanding Player – Hollis Price, Oklahoma

See also
2002 Big 12 Conference women's basketball tournament
2002 NCAA Division I men's basketball tournament
2001–02 NCAA Division I men's basketball rankings

References

Big 12 men's basketball tournament
Tournament
Big 12 men's basketball tournament
Big 12 men's basketball tournament
College sports tournaments in Missouri